Present, also known as Future, is a 1935 outdoor sculpture by Robert Ingersoll Aitken, located in front of the National Archives Building in Washington, D.C., in the United States. John Russell Pope served as the sculpture's architect and Edward H. Ratti served as its carver. The sculpture is made of Indiana limestone and measures approximately 20 x 8 x 12 feet, with a base approximately 12 x 12 x 15 feet. Present is a companion piece to Past, also located in front of the National Archives Building.

See also
 1935 in art
 List of public art in Washington, D.C., Ward 6

References

External links
 

1935 establishments in Washington, D.C.
1935 sculptures
Limestone sculptures in Washington, D.C.
Outdoor sculptures in Washington, D.C.
Sculptures of women in Washington, D.C.
Statues in Washington, D.C.
Federal Triangle